The Phobic is a 2006 psychological thriller directed by Margo Romero and produced by Alex Ryan Productions, Inc.

Cast 
 Courtney Gains - Dr. Cecil Westlake
 Juliette Marquis - Isabella Gibbons
 Eric Millegan - Reed Jenkins
 Silas Weir Mitchell - Vladimir Narcijac

External links 
 

2006 films
2006 horror films
2006 psychological thriller films
American horror films
2000s English-language films
2000s American films